Dupljaja is a village in Serbia. It is situated in the Bela Crkva municipality, in the South Banat District, Vojvodina province on the bank of the river Karaš. The village has a Serb ethnic majority (90.74%) and a population of 996 (2002 census).

History and archaeology

Archaeologist have discovered the remains of the old Slavic city Karaš, which was the capital and the largest fort of Banat in the 11th century. The remains include part of an old church and part of the building which supposedly was the palace of the prince, as well as several hundred coins that originated from central and western Europe and pieces of golden and silver jewels. 

There are also remains from Prehistory and from the Bronze Age (mostly belonging to the Dubovac culture). Famous archaeological Bronze Age artifacts from Dupljaja are the so-called "Dupljajska kolica" ("the carts from Dupljaja" in English), which are about 3,500 years old   and whose photograph features on Serbian drivers licenses. 

In 1921, the population of Dupljaja included 1,149 Serbs, 19 Romanians, 10 Slovaks, 10 Germans, and 2 Hungarians.

Historical population
1961: 1,174
1971: 1,165
1981: 1,152
1991: 1,027
2002: 854
2011: 738

See also
List of places in Serbia
List of cities, towns and villages in Vojvodina

References

RTS prilog
Jovan Erdeljanović, Srbi u Banatu, Novi Sad, 1992.
Slobodan Ćurčić, Broj stanovnika Vojvodine, Novi Sad, 1996.

External links
 Map of the Bela Crkva municipality showing the location of Dupljaja

Populated places in Serbian Banat
Populated places in South Banat District
Bela Crkva